Petr Král (4 September 1941 – 17 June 2020) was a Czech writer, initially influenced by surrealism.

Král was born in Prague. Having graduated from FAMU, he worked as an editor in the Orbis publishing house, where he focused on a line of books about film and filmmakers. In 1968, he emigrated to France where he worked in a gallery, a photo shop, as a teacher, interpreter, translator, screenplay author, reviewer and so on. In 1984 he lived in Québec. From 1990 to 1991 he was a cultural counsellor at the Czech embassy in Paris. He translated from and into French (mainly modern poetry). He edited several anthologies. Since April 2006, he resided in Prague.

List of works 
Petr Král started writing under the influence of surrealism, but from the 1970s, his books revealed that he felt a lack of fulfilment from the surrealist method. He wrote about eternal longing which is being nourished by itself, and perhaps leads to consuming the person who yearns. Král's emblematic words can be: "We don't die, it's much worse: we vanish. In other words, we never were. There is no reality."

 Vlasta Burian (with A. Král), 1969
 Prázdno světa, 1986
 Svědek stmívání, 1987
 Éra živých, 1989
 P. S. čili Cesty do ráje, 1990
 Právo na šedivou, 1991
 Pocit předsálí v aixské kavárně, 1991
 Med zatáček čili Dovětek k dějinám, 1992
 Voskovec a Werich čili Hvězdy klobouky, 1993
 Tyršovské přeháňky, 1994
 Fotografie v surrealismu, 1994
 Arsenál, 1994
 Soukromý život, 1996
 Pařížské sešity, 1996
 Mramor se jí studený (anthology of the Belgian Surrealist movement, as editor), 1996
 Staronový kontinent, 1997
 Chiméry a exil, 1998
 Groteska čili Morálka šlehačkového dortu, 1998
 Aimer Venise (Loving Venice), 1999
 Praha, 2000
 Pro anděla, 2000
 Základní pojmy, 2002
 Anthologie de la poésie tchèque contemporaine, 2002 (as editor, published in France by Gallimard)
 Bar Příroda čili Budoucnost 5 km, 2004
 Masiv a trhliny, 2004
 Přesuny, 2005
 Arco a jiné prózy, 2005
 Hm čili Míra omylu, 2006
 Úniky a návraty (interview with Petr Král by Radim Kopáč), 2006
 Notions de base, 2005 (Working Knowledge)
 Enquête sur des lieux, 2007 (In Search of the Essence of Place)
 Hum ou Marge d'erreur, 2007

English translations
 Working Knowledge, translated by Frank Wynne, Pushkin Press, 2008
 Loving Venice, translated by Christopher Moncrieff, Pushkin Press, 2011
 In Search of the Essence of Place, translated by Christopher Moncrieff, Pushkin Press, 2012

References

External links

 Petr Král in the internet Dictionary of Czech Literature, in Czech
 Petr Král: Bio, excerpts, interviews and articles in the archives of the Prague Writers' Festival 
 Poems and translations, in Czech

1941 births
2020 deaths
Czech poets
Czech male poets
Czechoslovak emigrants to France
Writers from Prague